Frank Fuseini Adongo is a Ghanaian politician and a Member of Parliament of the Parliament of Ghana. He is a member of the New Patriotic Party and the Deputy Regional Minister of the Upper East Region of Ghana.

Political life 
In March 2017, President Nana Akufo-Addo, name him one of the ten deputy regional ministers who would form part of his government. He was vetted by the Appointments Committee of the Parliament of Ghana in the same month. He was approved by the committee and his name was forwarded to Speaker of Parliament for further approval by the general house of parliament.

References

Living people
New Patriotic Party politicians
Ghanaian MPs 2017–2021
Year of birth missing (living people)